The Bull Hotel may refer to:

Hotels and inns in the United Kingdom:
 The Bull Hotel, Cambridge
 The Bull Hotel, Llangefni
 The Bull Hotel, Ludlow
 The Bull Hotel, Peterborough
 The Bull Hotel, Sedbergh